The Yugoslav Volleyball Championship was the highest level of volleyball competition in SFR Yugoslavia, contested between 1945 and 1991. After the dissolution of Yugoslavia, the league was succeeded by the following competitions:

Premier League of Volleyball of Bosnia and Herzegovina
Croatia Volleyball Championship
Macedonian Volleyball Championship
Slovenian Volleyball League
Serbian Volleyball League

Title holders (men)

 1945  Croatia
 1946  Partizan
 1947  Partizan
 1948  Mladost
 1949  Partizan
 1950  Partizan
 1951  Crvena Zvezda
 1952  Mladost
 1953  Partizan
 1954  Crvena Zvezda
 1955  Branik Maribor
 1956  Crvena Zvezda
 1957  Crvena Zvezda
 1958  Jugoslavija Belgrade
 1959  Jugoslavija Belgrade
 1960  Jugoslavija Belgrade
 1961  Jugoslavija Belgrade
 1962  Mladost
 1963  Mladost
 1964  Železničar Belgrade
 1965  Mladost
 1966  Mladost
 1967  Partizan
 1967–68  Mladost
 1968–69  Mladost
 1969–70  Mladost
 1970–71  Mladost
 1971–72  Gik Banat Zrenjanin
 1972–73  Partizan
 1973–74  Crvena Zvezda
 1974–75  Spartak Subotica
 1975–76  Vardar
 1976–77  Mladost
 1977–78  Partizan
 1978–79  Modriča
 1979–80  Veliko Gradište
 1980–81  Mladost
 1981–82  Mladost
 1982–83  Mladost
 1983–84  Mladost
 1984–85  Mladost
 1985–86  Mladost
 1986–87  Bosna
 1987–88  Vojvodina
 1988–89  Vojvodina
 1989–90  Partizan
 1990–91  Partizan

Source

Title holders (women)

Source

Championships by club

Men

Women

References

 

Volleyball competitions in Yugoslavia
Volleyball
Yugoslavia